Odo of Novara (c. 1105 – 14 January 1200) was an Italian Catholic priest and a professed member from the Carthusians.

Pope Pius IX confirmed his beatification in mid-1859.

Life
He was born in Novara around 1105 and was appointed as the prior of Geirach Charterhouse in Slovenia in 1189. But he experienced difficulties with Dietrich - the local bishop - who persecuted him. Odo went to Rome in 1190 to request Pope Clement III to relieve him of his office.

He became a chaplain after his resignation at a convent in Tagliacozzo. Odo died there in 1200 aged 95.

Beatification
A process of investigation into his manner of life was initiated at the request of Pope Gregory IX.  The Bishop of Trivento Riccardo described Odo as a "God-fearing man, modest and chaste, given up day and night to watching and prayer, clad only in rough garments of wool, living in a tiny cell ... obeying always the sound of the bell when it called him to office".

References

External links
Saints SQPN

1100s births
1200 deaths
12th-century venerated Christians
12th-century Italian Roman Catholic priests
Beatifications by Pope Pius IX
Carthusian saints
Italian beatified people
People from the Province of Novara